Slavic religion the religious beliefs, myths, and ritual practices of before and throughout the Christianisation of the Slavs.

Slavic religion may also refer to:

 Modern Slavic Native Faith (Rodnovery)
 Historical and modern Slavic Christianity